Dhakeshwari National Temple is a Hindu temple in Dhaka, Bangladesh. It is state-owned, giving it the distinction of being Bangladesh's 'National Temple'. The name "Dhakeshwari" (ঢাকেশ্বরী Ðhakeshshori) means "Goddess of Dhaka". It is also the largest Hindu temple in Bangladesh. This temple is part of the
famous Shakti Peethas in Indian Subcontinent. Here the gem of Sati's crown had fallen.

History 

The Dhakeshwari (Durga) temple was built in the 12th century by Ballal Sen, a king of the Sena dynasty, and it is said that the city Dhaka was named after the Goddess. The current architectural style of the temple cannot be dated to that period because of the numerous repairs, renovations, and rebuilding which have taken place over time. It is considered an essential part of Dhaka's cultural heritage. Many researchers believe that the temple is also one of the Shakti Peethas, where the jewel from the crown of the Goddess Sati had fallen. For ages, the temple has been held in great importance. The original 900-year-old murti was taken to Kumartuli, Kolkata, West Bengal, India. In 1947, during the partition of India, she was brought to Kolkata from Dhaka with millions of East Bengali (Now Bangladeshi) Hindu refugees. By 1950, the businessman Debendranath Chaudhary built the temple of Goddess in Kumortuli area and established some of the Goddess' property for her daily services. The idol is 1.5 feet tall, has ten arms, mounted on her lion in the form of Katyani Mahishasurmardini 'Durga'. On her two sides are Laxmi, Saraswati, Kartik and Ganesh. A Tiwari family from Azamgarh was appointed by the royal Sena (Sen) dynasty for daily worship of the deity of Dhaka. In 1960, the descendants of that Tiwari family came to Calcutta and were re-appointed, where they still serve the Goddess continuously.

Current presiding deity here in Dhakeshwari Temple is the replica of the original idol.

It is widely believed that the Queen, wife of King Bijoy Sen went to Langolbond for bathing. On her way back she gave birth to a son, known to historians as Ballal Sen. After ascending to the throne, Ballal Sen built this temple to glorify his birthplace.  Legends say that Ballal Sen once dreamt of the deity covered under the jungle. Ballal Sen uncovered the deity from there and built a temple, named for Dhakeswari. Whatever the legends describe, Hindus consider Dhakeswari to be the presiding deity of Dhaka, which is an incarnation or form of Goddess Durga the Adi Shakti. The idol of Durga is called Dhakeswari .

Structure

Exterior view 

Within the premises of the Dhakeswari there are temples of two types of architecture. The ancient one is of the Poncharotna Goddess Durga's which lost its actual look after the renovation work. Bradly Bird wrote this at the beginning of this century. Other than this there are four Shiv Temples. According to hearsay, in the 16th century King Mansing built these temples by laying four Shiv Lingas there. But this information seems to be unreliable. The fusion of Bangla chowchala and shikor temple is notice in the architecture of Dhakeshawri. Ratan Lal Chakraborti in an article mentioned that " the structure and architecture of it is like a Buddhist Pagoda". From this he assumed that the temple was probably built in the 10th century.

How did Dhakeshari temple look like in the 19th century? Ridoynath Majumder described about the temple. At that time the temple was covered by jungle and in its north the Urdu road went westward towards Pilkhana and at its south west was Mirpur road. At its south there was a wood and Urdu bazar was at the east.

Interior view 

The temple was panchoratno, at its front Natamandir and around it there is a row of rooms and a big pond and nahobottola gate through which elephants used to pass.  To the east there are tombs of some saints who used to pray or meditate at the temple. Outside the temple there are 5–6 pagodas with a shib linga. The priest of Dhakeshawri temple used pray every day.  The deity is doshvuja. It is believed that the representation of the deity is made of gold. At the left and right side of the deity there are some other murti. Like many ancient temples its inside is dark. To see the deity light is to be arranged. The temple is owned by many because it is bought by the new caretaker from the old caretakers. Jotindramohan bought it in 1901. Dhakeshawri is crowded but it is an abode of peace. The low sound of the tongue mixes with the evening light and tune of temple bell and make the peaceful environment a happy event.

Declaration as National Temple of Bangladesh 

In 1996, Dhakeshwari Temple was renamed Dhakeshwari Jatiya Mandir (National Temple) reflecting its position as the centre of Hindu culture and worship in Bangladesh. This was the culmination of a major campaign by Bangladeshi Hindu groups who had been demanding official recognition for the primary Hindu place of worship following the declaration of Islam as the state religion in 1988. As a result, the flag of Bangladesh is hoisted every morning outside the main temple premises, and it follows the National Flag Code rules such as rendering half-mast on nationally declared days of mourning.

As is the practice in other leading religious places of worship in Bangladesh, day-long prayers are common practice during important national holidays such as Independence Day, Language Martyrs' Day, Victory Day and birth and death anniversaries of former leaders such as Sheikh Mujibur Rahman and Ziaur Rahman.

Threats to temple security 

Historically, several of the temple custodians were tortured and killed by the Army though most, including the Head Priest, fled to their ancestral villages then to India and therefore escaped death.

A significant portion of the temple land has been lost due to the Vested Property Act and confiscation by the Bangladesh Government, and the current premises are considerably lower than the historic reach of the property.

Religious and socio-cultural activities 

Dhakeshwari Temple is a hub of socio-cultural as well as religious activity. Each year, the largest celebration of Durga Puja (the most important event in the Bengali Hindu calendar) in Dhaka is held at the National Temple, and a stream of dignitaries (such as the Bangladeshi President, Prime Minister, Leader of Opposition, Members of Parliament and media celebrities) come to felicitate the Bangladeshi Hindu community from the temple premises. A Bijaya Sammelani (cultural program following Durga Puja) takes place in the adjoining parade ground a few days after Durga Puja is complete, and is also a major cultural event in the Dhaka calendar, regularly attracting some of the top performers from the Dhaka music and film industry.

One of the most important events of the year is the Janmashthami procession which starts from Dhakeshwari temple and then proceeds through the streets of Old Dhaka; this occurs on the day of Lord Krishna's birthday, which is also a public holiday in Bangladesh and second only to Durga Puja in importance in the Bengali calendar. The procession dates back to 1902 but was stopped in 1948 following the establishment of Pakistan and subsequent attacks by Muslim mobs in Dhaka. The procession was resumed in 1989.

Concerts and charity drives (such as flood relief) are also a regular fixture within the temple throughout the year. Each year, Dhakeshwari Temple hosts major blood drives and inoculation programs which are open to all residents of Dhaka city.

At the old time, festivals happened on the month of Chaitra in temple complex of Dhakeswari. This place was crowded by various coloured shops. Virtous people used to visit the temple to gather religious merit and get back to their home. Millions of Hindu religious people would take bath at Langolbondon on the month of Choitra on Sukla Ostomi time to get rid of their sins. People in huge numbers used to come to Dhakeswari temple on foot from different roads to be blessed by the deity Durga. It was the best moment of their whole year. With great hope they would come out from their home, and it was reflected on their faces, to get rid of their sins by worshiping the Deity with exclusive devotion and bowing their head to meditation of Bhagaban. They forget about everything- hunger, sleep, restlessness – and they just believe that they will be blessed and they step up for the temple. All those people were divided into small groups with each group having ten to twenty people. The groups consisted of mainly women, only one man, who is the oldest of the village, was there for taking care of them. They came from very long distance by forming groups. People of different ages, including the oldest and skinniest, were also gathered with these groups.  Young people from the nearest city to the temple volunteering for the people would come from long distance to be blessed by the Deity, with a great concentration, eagerness to the worship of the Deity and often bowing by shouting "Oom Dhaka eswari".

In present days, each year, the largest celebration of Durga puja (the most important event in the Bengali Hindu calendar) in Dhaka is held at the National Temple, and a stream of dignitaries come to felicitate the Bangladeshi Hindu community from the temple premises. Several thousand worshippers and onlookers stream through the premises where they are offered prasad (food – usually rice and lentils). A Bijaya Sammilan (a cultural program following Durga Puja) takes place in the adjoining parade ground a few days after Durga Puja is complete, and is also a major cultural event in the Dhaka calendar. Durga Puja comes to an end after five days, through the celebration of Bijoya Dashami after performing the sacred rituals of Sashthi, Saptami, Ashtami and Navami. Bijoya Dashami will end with the idols of Durga and her four children Lakshmi, Saraswati, Kartik and Ganesha taken in processions for immersion in river or sea. A processions starts from the temple.

Prime Minister of India Narendra Modi prayed at the temple during his official visit to Bangladesh on 7 June 2015. He was given a model of the goddess Dhakeshwari by the temple authorities.

Present condition 

It was severely damaged during the 1971 Bangladesh Liberation War, and over half of the temple's buildings were destroyed. The main worship hall was taken over by the Pakistan Army and used as an ammunitions storage area.

In 2018, the Bangladesh prime minister Sheikh Hasina visited the Dhakeshwari Temple and announced gifting of adjacent land to the temple authorities. Previously, the temple lost a lot of its property to land grabbing.

Gallery

See also 
 Dhakeshwari Mata Temple, Kumortuli
 Hinduism in Bangladesh
 Architecture of Bangladesh
 Bagha Mosque
 Khan Mohammad Mridha Mosque
 Saat Masjid
 Shahbaz Khan Mosque
 Shona Mosque
 Sixty Dome Mosque

References 

Old Dhaka
Hindu temples in Dhaka
Tourist attractions in Dhaka
National symbols of Bangladesh